Six-Bit Transcode, or Six-Bit Transmission Code, was, for a few years, one of the three character sets used by IBM for Binary Synchronous Communications. Transmission using 6-bit Transcode had higher throughput than transmission using 8-bit EBCDIC or ASCII, provided that the data to be transmitted used a limited set of 48 characters.

The IBM 2780 data transmission terminal was announced with Transcode support in 1967. Its successor, the IBM 3780 data communication terminal, announced in 1972, dropped Transcode support and added a "space compression" option.

Transcode is a six-bit character code. It relates to IBM's punched card code but, like EBCDIC, it is not BCD. Its 64 values consist of the 26 uppercase letters, 10 numbers, 11 symbols, space, and 16 control characters. Its 48 printable characters are ABCDEFGHIJKLMNOPQRSTUVWXYZ0123456789 .'-/@#$%&*⌑; it cannot represent ,:;!?"()[]<>+^=_\`{}|~. Characters are transmitted with odd parity. The 2780 cannot use the 16 control characters as data characters in Transcode mode.

Code table

Code table (from 2780 manual)

Devices using Transcode
 IBM 2701 Data Adapter Unit
 IBM 2703 Transmission Control
 IBM 2780 Data Transmission Terminal
 IBM System/370 model 135 Integrated Communications Adapter (ICA)

References

Character encoding
IBM computer hardware